Jessica L. Webb is a Canadian writer of mystery thriller novels. Her second published novel, Pathogen, won the Lambda Literary Award for Lesbian Mystery at the 29th Lambda Literary Awards in 2017, and her fourth novel, Repercussions, is a shortlisted nominee in the same category at the 30th Lambda Literary Awards in 2018.

Her novels, centring on medical investigator Dr. Kate Morrison, are published by Bold Strokes Books.

Works
Trigger (2016)
Pathogen (2016)
Troop 18 (2017)
Repercussions (2017)
Shadowboxer (2018)

References

21st-century Canadian novelists
21st-century Canadian women writers
Canadian women novelists
Canadian mystery writers
Canadian LGBT novelists
Lambda Literary Award winners
Writers from Ontario
Living people
Year of birth missing (living people)
21st-century Canadian LGBT people